This is a list of fellows of the Royal Society elected in 1701.

Fellows
Cyril Arthington (c.1666–1720)
James Drake (1667–1707)
Christian Leyoncrona (c.1662–1710)
Owen Lloyd (c.1674–1738)
John Perceval, 1st Earl of Egmont (1683–1748)
John Shadwell (1671–1747)

References

1701
1701 in science
1701 in England